Kimmo Kalevi Immeri Sasi (born 21 February 1952) is a Finnish politician and lawyer. A member of the centre-right National Coalition Party, he has served a member of the Parliament of Finland since 1983. He served as Minister of Foreign Trade from 1999 to 2002 and as Minister of Transport and Communications in the government of Finland from 2002 to 2003. He was chairman of the parliamentary committee on constitutional affairs from 2003 to 2011, and has served as chairman of the standing committee on finance since 2011. He served as President of the Nordic Council in 2012.

References

1952 births
Living people
Politicians from Tampere
National Coalition Party politicians
Government ministers of Finland
Ministers of Transport and Public Works of Finland
Members of the Parliament of Finland (1983–87)
Members of the Parliament of Finland (1987–91)
Members of the Parliament of Finland (1991–95)
Members of the Parliament of Finland (1995–99)
Members of the Parliament of Finland (1999–2003)
Members of the Parliament of Finland (2003–07)
Members of the Parliament of Finland (2007–11)
Members of the Parliament of Finland (2011–15)
Recipients of the Order of the Cross of Terra Mariana, 2nd Class